Colin Holmes may refer to:

 Colin Holmes (historian) (born 1938), British author, scholar, and historian
 Colin Holmes (Gaelic footballer), Gaelic football player for County Tyrone